Jenks Academy for the Arts and Sciences is a public K-8 school in the Chestnut Hill section of Philadelphia, Pennsylvania, and is part of the School District of Philadelphia. Jenks serves children from kindergarten through eighth grade and has a student population of about 600. There are two classes in each grade as well as specialized programs for life skills, inclusion/learning support and  gifted support.  Jenks students are required to wear school uniforms.

History

The school was built in 1922 as the John Story Jenks School. It was built in Tudor Revival/Late Gothic Revival style and designed by Irwin T. Catharine, longtime architect for the school district. The building is yellow brick and is relatively ornate with a parapet and stylized Flemish gable at the top of the building.  It was built by Cramp & Co.  The building was listed on the National Register of Historic Places in 1988.

Jenks was named after John Story Jenks (1839-1923), the merchant, of Randolph and Jenks, who was also a director of Pennsylvania Hospital, Philadelphia Trust Company, Western Savings Fund, Western National Bank and the Insurance Company of North America. He was a member of the Union League, the Historical Society of Pennsylvania and the American Philosophical Society.  His home, Inglewood Cottage, designed by Cope & Stewardson, is also located in Chestnut Hill. He served on the Philadelphia Board of Education and was an avid collector and numismatist. He believed coin collecting was “instructive to any young girl or boy” for learning geography, history and languages. 

In 2014, the school was renamed to Jenks Academy for the Arts and Sciences. The change came because of an increased focus on the STEM fields.

Notable alumni
Samantha Johnson - Miss Pennsylvania USA 2007

Feeder patterns
Residents zoned to Jenks are zoned to Roxborough High School.

Residents zoned to Jenks were zoned to Germantown High School prior to Germantown's closure.

References

External links

"John S. Jenks Elementary School Geographic Boundaries" (Archive). School District of Philadelphia.

School buildings on the National Register of Historic Places in Philadelphia
Public elementary schools in Philadelphia
Public middle schools in Pennsylvania
School District of Philadelphia
1924 establishments in Pennsylvania
Chestnut Hill, Philadelphia
Historic district contributing properties in Pennsylvania